The 2018 Nagano gubernatorial election was held on 5 August 2018 to elect the next governor of , a prefecture of Japan located in the Chūbu region of Honshu island. Incumbent Governor Shuichi Abe was re-elected for a third term, defeating Chuichi Kanai with 85.14% of the vote.

Candidates  

Shuichi Abe, 57, incumbent since 2010, bureaucrat. Backed by DPFP, LDP, Komeito, CDP and SDP.
Chuichi Kanai, 68, former Ueda Municipal Assembly member. Presented by the JCP.

Results

References 

2018 elections in Japan
Nagano gubernational elections
Politics of Nagano Prefecture